Comment te dire adieu is the ninth studio album by French singer-songwriter Françoise Hardy, released in 1968 on Disques Vogue. Like many of her previous records, it was originally released without a title and came to be referred to, later on, by the name of its most popular song. The cover artwork was a drawing by Jean-Paul Goude.

Track listing 
 "Comment te dire adieu" – 2:26Original title: "It Hurts to Say Goodbye"Lyrics by: Arnold GolandMusic written by: Jack GoldFirst performed by: Margaret Whiting, 1966Also performed by its composer as Jack Gold Orchestra, 1969   French adaptation and arrangement by: Serge GainsbourgAccompanist: Jean-Pierre Sabar
 "Où va la chance ?" – 3:14Original title: "There But for Fortune"Lyrics and music written by: Phil OchsFirst performed by: Joan Baez, 1964French adaptation by: Eddy MarnayAccompanist: Arthur Greenslade
 "L’anamour" –  2:14Lyrics and music written by: Serge GainsbourgAccompanist: Mike Vickers
 "Suzanne" – 3:08Lyrics and music by: Leonard Cohen (English version)First performed by: Judy Collins, 1966French adaptation by: Graeme AllwrightFirst performed by: Graeme Allwright, 1967Accompanist: John Cameron
 "Il n’y a pas d’amour heureux" – 2:21Lyrics: poem by Louis AragonMusic written by: Georges Brassens First performed by: Georges Brassens, 1953Accompanist: Jean-Pierre Sabar
 "La mésange" – 2:16Original title: "Sabiá"Lyrics by: Antônio Carlos JobimMusic written by: Antônio Carlos Jobim and Chico Buarque de HolandaFirst performed by: Antônio Carlos Jobim, 1968French adaptation by: Franck GéraldAccompanist: Mike Vickers
 "Parlez-moi de lui" – 2:37Original title: "The Way of Love"Lyrics by: Al StillmanMusic written by: Jack DiévalFirst performed by: Kathy Kirby, 1965French adaptation by: Michel RivgaucheFirst performed by: Michèle Arnaud and Dalida, 1966Accompanist: Arthur Greenslade
 "À quoi ça sert ?" – 3:31Lyrics and music written by: Françoise HardyAccompanist: Jean-Pierre Sabar
 "Il vaut mieux une petite maison dans la main, qu’un grand château dans les nuages" – 2:23Lyrics by: Jean-Max RivièreMusic written by: Gérard BourgeoisAccompanist: John Cameron
 "La rue des cœurs perdus" – 2:07Original title: "Lonesome Town"Lyrics and music written by: Baker KnightFirst performed by: Ricky Nelson, 1958French adaptation by: Pierre DelanoëFirst performed by: Richard Anthony, 1959Accompanist: Arthur Greenslade
 "Étonnez-moi Benoît...!" – 3:03 Lyrics by: Patrick ModianoMusic written by: Hughes de CoursonAccompanist: John Cameron
 "La mer, les étoiles et le vent" – 1:51Lyrics and music written by: Françoise HardyAccompanist: John Cameron

Editions

LP records: first editions in the English-speaking world 
 , 1969: World Record (ORC 6036).
 , 1969: Reprise Records (RSC 8003).
 , 1970: Disques Vogue/Phono Vox (LPV 004).
 , 1970: A Portrait of Françoise, Interfusion (SITFL 934.133).

Reissue on CD 
 , 1995: Comment te dire adieu, Ed. Kundalini/Virgin Records (7243 8 40502 2 1).

Notes and references 

Françoise Hardy albums
1968 albums
French-language albums
Disques Vogue albums